The Battle of Saltville may refer to one of two American Civil War Battles fought at the same location:

 First Battle of Saltville (October 1–3, 1864)
 Second Battle of Saltville (December 20–21, 1864)